James Barbour (1775–1842) was an American lawyer, politician and planter.

James Barbour may also refer to:

 James Barbour (burgess) (1734–1804), landowner and member of the Virginia House of Burgesses
 James Barbour (lawyer) (1828–1895), Virginia lawyer, planter, politician and Confederate officer
 James Barbour (architect) (1834–1912) Scottish architect and antiquarian
 James J. Barbour (1869–1946), American politician and lawyer
 James Murray Barbour (1897–1970), American acoustician, musicologist and composer
 James Barbour (singer) (born 1966), American singer and Broadway actor